Nikolay Puklakov (15 January 1945 – 14 August 2009) was a Russian long-distance runner who competed in the 1972 Summer Olympics.

References

1945 births
2009 deaths
Russian male long-distance runners
Soviet male long-distance runners
Olympic athletes of the Soviet Union
Athletes (track and field) at the 1972 Summer Olympics
Universiade medalists in athletics (track and field)
Universiade gold medalists for the Soviet Union
Medalists at the 1970 Summer Universiade